Avantika Shetty is an Indian actress and advertiser working primarily in Kannada cinema. She made her film debut in RangiTaranga (2015) which found a worldwide release and declared a blockbuster, earning her a nomination at the Filmfare Awards for Best Supporting Actress. Prior to films, Shetty acted in a few television series and short films in Mumbai.

Early life and career

Avantika Shetty was born in a Tulu-speaking Tuluva Bunt community in Mangalore. She made her big screen debut with debutante Anup Bhandari's directorial Kannada thriller-drama RangiTaranga (2015), playing the role of Sandhya Bhargav, a journalist on the search of a mysterious writer with the pen name Anashku played by another debutante, Nirup Bhandari. Upon release, the film was a sleeper hit which went onto become a blockbuster through the word-of-mouth reviews. The film was released across many countries and won favorable reviews. The film was declared as one of the highest-grossing films in Kannada cinema. Shetty earned a nomination at the Filmfare Awards for her portrayal as the supporting actress. Following this successful debut, she signed her second assignment for R. Anantharaju's forthcoming horror-comedy film Kalpana 2 opposite Upendra. A remake of Raghava Lawrence's successful Tamil film, Kanchana 2, Shetty reprises the role played by Tapsee Pannu in the original. She has reportedly teamed up yet again with the Bhandari brothers for their upcoming project titled Rajaratha which was unveiled on the Dancing Stars 3 reality show by actor V. Ravichandran.

Filmography

Films
 All films are in Kannada, unless otherwise noted.

Television

Short films

References

External links

Avantika Shetty celebrity biography
Facebook page

Living people
Mangaloreans
Tulu people
Actresses in Kannada cinema
Indian film actresses
Actresses in Tamil cinema
Indian television actresses
21st-century Indian actresses
Actresses from Mangalore
Indian radio presenters
Indian Internet celebrities
Indian women radio presenters
1986 births